Sir Coleridge Arthur Fitzroy Kennard, 1st Baronet (12 May 1885 – 7 October 1948) was a wealthy English aristocrat and diplomat.

Early life
Roy, as he was known, was born on 12 May 1885. He was the only child of Helen (née Wyllie) Kennard (1856–1928) and Lieutenant Hugh Coleridge Downing Kennard (1859–1886) of the 1st Battalion of the Grenadier Guards, who married in 1883. After his father's death in 1886, his mother remarried to James Laurence Carew, an Irish nationalist politician and Member of Parliament, in 1896. His aunt, Meredith Sophia Frances Kennard, Lady Rawlinson, was the wife of Lt. Gen. Sir Henry Seymour Rawlinson, 2nd Baronet.

In 1904, Jacques-Émile Blanche painted a portrait of Roy "which captures him at the age of 19 as a young dandy, as he was renowned in fashionable society for his good looks." His mother, a close friend of Oscar Wilde, reportedly strongly disapproved of the portrait of her son as a tall, slender man with long tapered fingers caused a "life-long rift" between his mother and Blanche and was not exhibited between 1908 and 1924. Roy, however, agreed to exhibit the painting as long as his name was not disclosed. Therefore, the portrait was exhibited anonymously in 1924 under the title "Le portrait de Dorian Gray". In 1909, his mother instigated the commission of the Oscar Wilde's tomb in Père Lachaise Cemetery in Paris by Jacob Epstein with her donation to Robert Ross.

Kennard was educated at Eton College.

Career

On 11 February 1891, the then five-year-old Coleridge was created baronet of Fernhill in the County of Southampton. The baronetcy was originally intended for his grandfather and namesake Coleridge Kennard, co-founder of the Evening News and Member of Parliament for Salisbury from 1882 to 1885, who had died on 25 December 1890, before the patent was gazetted.  His grandmother Ellen Georgiana Kennard had on 17 January 1892 been granted the style and precedence as if her husband had been created a baronet.

Diplomatic career
After serving in the Grenadier Guards like his father, he joined the Diplomatic Service, serving between 1908 and 1919, in Italy, Persia, Sweden and Finland.

Personal life
Reportedly, while serving at the foreign office, he "became infatuated with the wife of James Frances Buckley, of Castle Gorford, in Carmarthenshire. After Kennard made his intentions of marriage known, in writing (and threatening suicide if she did not elope with him), Buckley and his wife divorced. While waiting for the statutory six-month period to expire, Mrs. Buckley went to Italy and Kennard went to Persia to serve as attaché and third secretary under Sir George Head Barclay.  While in Tehran, he met Barclay's daughter, Dorothy Katherine Barclay (–1953). Roy and Dorothy fell in love and when Mrs. Buckley travelled to Tehran to meet him, he refused to see her.  As British Minister Plenipotentiary, who had authority over all British subjects in Persia, Sir George forced Mrs. Buckley to leave the country.

Kennard married Dorothy on 5 April 1911, Dorothy, an author who published a book about her life in Roumania, was the only child of Barclay and his American wife, Lady Barclay, the former Beatrix Mary Jay Chapman. Dorothy's maternal grandfather was Henry Grafton Chapman Jr., who served as President of the New York Stock Exchange, and her uncle was noted writer John Jay Chapman. Her maternal great-grandfather was John Jay, the U.S. Minister to Austria-Hungary. Before their 1918 divorce, they were the parents of two sons:

 Sir Lawrence Ury Charles Kennard, 2nd Baronet (1912–1967), who married Joan Liesl Perschke, daughter of William Thomas Perschke.
 Sir George Arnold Ford Kennard, 3rd Baronet (1915–1999), a Lieutenant-Colonel of the 4th Queen's Own Hussars who married four times.

On 21 July 1924, Kennard married for the second time to Mary Graham Orr-Lewis (d. 1931), the youngest daughter of Canadian businessman Sir Frederick Orr-Lewis, 1st Baronet and Maude (née Booth) Orr-Lewis. After her father's death, her brother became the 2nd Baronet, and her sister, Helen Merryday Orr-Lewis, married Sir Albert Gerald Stern.

Kennard died on 7 October 1948 and his eldest son became the 2nd Kennard baronet.  Upon the death of his youngest son, the third Baronet, the baronetcy became extinct as there were no male issue.

Descendants
Through his son George, he was the grandfather of Zandra Kennard (b. 1941), who married Major John Middleton Neilson Powell in 1962 and is the mother of Edward Coleridge Cokayne Powell (b. 1964) and Louise Cecilia Powell (b. 1966). Edward Coleridge Cokayne Powell is father to Nikita Louise Powell and Daniel Peter George Powell.

References

External links
 Sir Coleridge Arthur Fitzroy Kennard, 1st Bt (1885–1948), Diplomat at the National Portrait Gallery, London.

1885 births
1948 deaths
People educated at Eton College
Baronets in the Baronetage of the United Kingdom